Pat Roberge (born 18 September 1970) is a Canadian judoka. He competed in the men's half-heavyweight event at the 1992 Summer Olympics.

References

External links
 

1970 births
Living people
Canadian male judoka
Olympic judoka of Canada
Judoka at the 1992 Summer Olympics
Sportspeople from Saguenay, Quebec